Joshua Michael de Caires (born 25 April 2002) is an English cricketer, and the son of former England cricketer Michael Atherton. He made his first-class debut on 5 July 2021, for Middlesex in the 2021 County Championship. His debut came after he had earlier that season scored an unbeaten century at Headingley against a Yorkshire attack that included David Willey in a non-first class fixture.

Personal life
Josh de Caires is from Paddington, Middlesex, England. He is the son of former England cricketer Michael Atherton, and the great-grandson of former West Indian cricketer Frank De Caires. De Caires says that he has rarely seen his father batting, as he was born eight months after Atherton's last Test match. He was given his mother's maiden name, but does not know why. De Caires attended St Albans School, Hertfordshire, where he was coached by former England cricketer Mark Ilott, and is a student of economics at the University of Leeds.

Career
De Caires is a batsman, who often opens the batting. He started playing for Middlesex CCC under-14s in 2015. On debut, he scored 90*. In 2017, de Caires made his debut for Middlesex Second XI, at the age of 15. In 2019, he hit a century in a Second XI Championship match against Hampshire.

In 2020, de Caires played for Middlesex in a two-day pre-season friendly against Northamptonshire CCC. In August 2020, de Caires signed a three-year professional contract with Middlesex. In club cricket, de Caires played for Radlett Cricket Club in the 2020 Hertfordshire Cricket League season. He was the league's second-highest wicket taker. In 2021, de Caires played for Leeds/Bradford MCCU in a match against Yorkshire CCC. He scored 118 from 292 deliveries to help Leeds/Bradford secure a draw in the match. The match did not have first-class status, as university matches no longer qualify for first-class status. The Yorkshire bowling attack included England bowler David Willey. He also played for Tickhill Cricket Club in 2021.

De Caires made his first-class debut on 5 July 2021, for Middlesex in the 2021 County Championship. On 9 July 2021, he made his Twenty20 debut, also for Middlesex, in the 2021 T20 Blast. He made his List A debut on 3 August 2021, for Middlesex in the 2021 Royal London One-Day Cup.

In 2022, De Caires scored a half-century for Leeds/Bradford MCCU in a match against Yorkshire. In Middlesex's first match of the 2022 County Championship, he scored his maiden first-class half-century.

References

External links
 

2002 births
Living people
English cricketers
Middlesex cricketers
People from Paddington